Tomaszewicz is a Polish language surname. It is a patronymic form of the male given name Thomas – and may refer to:
Andrzej Tomaszewicz (1943–2020), Polish historian and politician
Anna Tomaszewicz-Dobrska (1854–1918), Polish physician

References 

Polish-language surnames
Patronymic surnames
Surnames from given names